Shirala Assembly constituency is one of the 288 Vidhan Sabha (legislative assembly) constituencies of Maharashtra state in western India.

Overview
Shirala (constituency number 284) is one of the eight Vidhan Sabha constituencies located in the Sangli district. It covers the entire Shirala tehsil and part of the Walwa tehsil of this district.

Shirala is part of the Hatkanangale Lok Sabha constituency along with five other Vidhan Sabha segments, namely Islampur in Sangli district and Shahuwadi, Hatkanangale, Ichalkaranji and Shirol in the Kolhapur district.

Members of Legislative Assembly
 1978: Shivajirao Deshmukh, Independent (politician)
 1980: Shivajirao Deshmukh, Indian National Congress
 1985: Shivajirao Deshmukh, Indian National Congress
 1990: Shivajirao Deshmukh, Indian National Congress
 1995: Shivajirao Naik, Independent
 1999: Shivajirao Naik, Nationalist Congress Party
 2004: Shivajirao Naik, Independent
 2009: Mansing Fattesingrao Naik, Independent
 2014: Shivajirao Naik, Bharatiya Janata Party 
 2019: Mansing Fattesingrao Naik, Nationalist Congress Party

Election results

Assembly Election 2009

References

Assembly constituencies of Maharashtra
Sangli district